Clinostomidae is a family of trematodes in the order Diplostomida.

References

Diplostomida
Animal families